Maciejowice  is a village in Garwolin County, Masovian Voivodeship, in east-central Poland. It is the seat of the gmina (administrative district) called Gmina Maciejowice. The village has a population of 1,400, and used to be a town from 1507 until 1870. Its name comes from the Maciejowski family, which in the past owned Maciejowice.

For centuries Maciejowice was part of the Land of Stezyca, which belonged to Lesser Poland’s Sandomierz Voivodeship. In 1794, the Battle of Maciejowice took place near the village. In the early years of the Polish statehood, this part of the country was sparsely populated, due to proximity of the eastern border. First local village, mentioned in documents, is Kochow (one kilometer south of Maciejowice), which was founded in 1155. In the late 12th century, a Roman Catholic parish of Kochow was established, and in the 15th century, the area of the future Maciejowice was purchased by a local nobleman Kacper Maciejowski. The village remained in the hands of the Maciejowski family until the late 17th century.

In 1507, King Sigismund I the Old granted town charter to Maciejowice. The town itself was located in the area of the village of Ostrow. In 1557, King Sigismund II Augustus granted several privileges to Maciejowice. The town at that time belonged to the Castellan of Sandomierz, Stanislaw Maciejowski, and with the royal permission, it was allowed to organize fairs. Furthermore, the construction of a defensive castle was initiated. Since the late 17th century Maciejowice belonged to several noble families, such as the Potocki family and the Zamoyski family. Until the Partitions of Poland, it remained in Sandomierz Voivodeship. In 1815 - 1915, it was part of Russian-controlled Congress Poland.

In the late 18th and early 19th centuries, the Zamoyski family opened here an Agricultural School, rebuilt the castle, and opened several enterprises. During the January Uprising, a local unit of Polish rebels under Colonel Walenty Lewandowski attacked a Russian unit located at Laskarzew (Jan. 28, 1863). In 1870, following many other locations of northern Lesser Poland, Maciejowice lost its town charter.

In the summer 1915, heavy Russian-German fighting took place in the area of the village, and on August 13, 1920 (see Polish-Soviet War), a Red Army unit penetrated as far as a local village of Kobylnica. In September 1939, during the Invasion of Poland, two large units of the Polish Army (13th Infantry Division and Wilenska Cavalry Brigade) evacuated eastwards on a wooden bridge at Przewoz. The bridge was destroyed on Sept. 9, 1939.

Among points of interest there are:
 cobbled market place with a town hall, a museum and a former hospital (1796),
 Roman Catholic parish church (1772-1780),
 two monuments of Tadeusz Kosciuszko,
 a tomb of the Zamoyski family, located behind the church (1908),
 a palace at Podzamcze, with stables, located in the spot of the ancient castle.

External links
 Jewish Community in Maciejowice on Virtual Shtetl

References

Maciejowice
Lublin Governorate
Warsaw Voivodeship (1919–1939)